Pahiatua is a former New Zealand parliamentary electorate in the Wairarapa region. It existed from 1896 to 1996, and was represented by nine Members of Parliament, including Prime Minister Keith Holyoake for 34 years.

Population centres
In the 1896 electoral redistribution, rapid population growth in the North Island required the transfer of three seats from the South Island to the north. Four electorates that previously existed were re-established, and three electorates were established for the first time, including Pahiatua. The original area of the Pahiatua electorate included the towns of Pahiatua and Woodville. Over time, the electorate shifted slightly north, until the town of Dannevirke was covered following the 1918 electoral redistribution.

The 1946 electoral redistribution took the abolition of the country quota into account, and as a rural electorate, the area covered by the Pahiatua electorate increased significantly. Eketahuna and Castlepoint were gained by the electorate in that process.

History
The Pahiatua electorate existed from 1896 to 1996. Early holders of the seat were John O'Meara from 1896 to 1904, Bill Hawkins from 1904 to 1905, Robert Beatson Ross from 1905 to 1911, James Escott from 1911 to 1916, Harold Smith from 1916 to 1919, Archibald McNicol from 1919 to 1922, and Alfred Ransom from 1922 to 1943.

The seat was held by Prime Minister Keith Holyoake for 34 years, until he resigned to become Governor-General. In 1996 John Falloon, who had been the MP for Pahiatua for 19 years, chose to retire.

Members of Parliament
Key

Election results

1977 by-election

1975 election

1972 election

1969 election

1966 election

1963 election

1960 election

1957 election

1954 election

1951 election

1949 election

1946 election

1943 election

1928 election

1916 by-election

1904 by-election

1899 election

1896 election

Notes

References

Historical electorates of New Zealand
Politics of Manawatū-Whanganui
1896 establishments in New Zealand
1996 disestablishments in New Zealand